Orlando McKay (born October 2, 1969) is an American former gridiron football wide receiver.  He played for one season with the Green Bay Packers of the National Football League (NFL). He was signed in 1993 by the Philadelphia Eagles before concluding his playing career with the Hamilton Tigercats and Memphis Mad Dogs.

McKay currently is the football and track coach at Memphis University School (MUS) in Memphis, Tennessee. At MUS, McKay coached the Owls to four state football championships and two state track championships.

High school
McKay attended Mesa High School in Mesa, Arizona where he won the 1988 state track titles in the 100-, 200- and 400-meters and three 400 titles.

College
McKay started at the Wide Receiver position for the University of Washington for three years before being selected in the fifth round of the 1992 NFL Draft by Green Bay (130th overall).

He had the 41st fastest time in the world in the 400 meter dash in 1990.

In college, he came away with Rose Bowl and National Championship Football rings, as #4 on the Washington Huskies as well as three Pac-10 All-Academic seasons.

References

1969 births
Living people
American football wide receivers
Green Bay Packers players
Hamilton Tiger Cubs players
Memphis Mad Dogs players
Washington Huskies football players
High school football coaches in Tennessee
Sportspeople from Mesa, Arizona
Players of American football from Arizona
Mesa High School alumni